Moghan may refer to:

 Moghan, Ardebil
 Moghan, Hormozgan
 Moghan, Isfahan
 Moghan, Chenaran, Razavi Khorasan Province
 Moghan, Kashmar, Razavi Khorasan Province
 Moghan, Torqabeh and Shandiz, Razavi Khorasan Province
 Moghan, Semnan

See also
 Moghan, County Tyrone, a townland in County Tyrone, Northern Ireland